The 2011 Individual Ice Racing European Championship is the 2011 version of UEM Individual Ice Racing European Championship season. The final will be host in Tolyatti, Samara Oblast, Russia on 30 January 2011.

Qualifications

Semi-final 
  Tolyatti, Samara Oblast
29 January 2011
Anatoly Stepanov Stadium (Length: 260 m)
Referee and Jury President: TBA
References

The Final 
  Tolyatti, Samara Oblast
30 January 2011
Anatoly Stepanov Stadium (Length: 260 m)
Referee and Jury President: TBA
References

See also 
 2011 Individual Ice Racing World Championship
 Ice speedway

References 

Ice speedway competitions
European Individual